Doreen Brownstone OM ( Stein; 28 September 1922 – 16 December 2022) was a British-born Canadian actress, based in Winnipeg, Manitoba.

Biography
Brownstone was born on 28 September 1922, and was a mainstay of the Winnipeg theatre and television scene. She started acting in the RAF during WWII, moved to Winnipeg as a war bride, and, in 1958, starred opposite Gordon Pinsent in the very first production at the very first regional theatre in North America (Hatful of Rain at Royal Manitoba Theatre Centre, directed by John Hirsch). 

As head of Television at CBC, Hirsch also cast Brownstone regularly in the popular soap opera House of Pride.

In 2013, Brownstone received the Lifetime Achievement Award from the Winnipeg Arts Council. In 2017, she was appointed a Member of the Order of Manitoba (OM).

Brownstone turned 100 on 28 September 2022, and died on 16 December.

Filmography
 The Stone Angel (2007)
 What If God Were the Sun? (2007)
 High Life (2009)
 Foodland (2010)
 Silent Night (2012)

References

External links
 

1922 births
2022 deaths
Actresses from Leeds
Actresses from Winnipeg
Canadian centenarians
English emigrants to Canada
Members of the Order of Manitoba
Women centenarians